RAF Eastleigh may refer to:

RAF Eastleigh, a former RAF base in the Eastleigh suburb of Nairobi, Kenya
A World War I airfield near Eastleigh, Hampshire, England briefly known as RAF Eastleigh in 1935, renamed RAF Southampton and later Southampton Airport, where early test flights of the Supermarine Spitfire were conducted